Rustams Begovs (born June 26, 1993) is a Latvian ice hockey player currently playing for the HK Rīga of the MHL.

Playing career
Begovs began his hockey career playing in minor and junior Latvian hockey leagues. In 2011/2012 season he began playing in Dinamo Riga system and in 2012/13 season he joined HK Rīga Dinamo Rīga minor league affiliate.
On November 17 he made his KHL debut against HC Yugra.

International
Begovs participated at the 2012 World Junior Ice Hockey Championships as a member of the Latvia men's national junior ice hockey team.

References

External links

1993 births
Living people
People from Olaine
Latvian ice hockey centres
HK Riga players
Dinamo Riga players